Phyllis Crane (August 7, 1914October 12, 1982) was a Canadian-born American film actress. She appeared in over 45 films between 1928 and 1937.

Career
Crane signed with Columbia Pictures in 1934. Modern viewers will recognize Crane from her appearances in several early Three Stooges films, such as Three Little Pigskins, Uncivil Warriors, and Pop Goes the Easel.

Perhaps her most famous role was as Professor Nichols' daughter in Hoi Polloi who Moe Howard tries to romance. While talking to him, she coos that he will find the "eternal spring" (the season).

Death
Crane died of esophageal cancer in New York City on October 12, 1982.

Selected filmography
 So This Is College (1929)
 The Girl Said No (1930)
 College Lovers (1930)
 Ten Cents a Dance (1931)
 Possessed (1931) (uncredited)
 Men in Black (1934) (uncredited)
 Three Little Pigskins (1934)
 Pop Goes the Easel (1935) (uncredited)
 Uncivil Warriors (1935)
 Hoi Polloi (1935) (uncredited)
 Ants in the Pantry (1936) (uncredited)
 Below the Deadline (1936) (uncredited)
 A Pain in the Pullman (1936) (uncredited)
 My Man Godfrey (1936) (uncredited)

References

External links

1912 births
1982 deaths
Canadian film actresses
Actresses from Calgary
Deaths from throat cancer
Deaths from cancer in New York (state)
20th-century Canadian actresses
Canadian emigrants to the United States